Events in the year 2023 in Colombia.

Incumbents 
 President: Gustavo Petro
 Vice President: Francia Márquez
 Government: Cabinet of Gustavo Petro

Events

January 
 1 January – Colombia and Venezuela agrees to reopen the last remaining border that has been previously blocked by authorities due to worsening ties.
 20 January – A Dominican man who was lost in the Caribbean Sea for 24 days is rescued by the Colombian Navy.

Predicted and scheduled events 
 19 January –12 February: 2023 South American U-20 Championship
 14 October: An annular solar eclipse will be visible in the Western U.S., Mexico, Central America, Colombia, and Brazil and will be the 44th solar eclipse of Solar Saros 134.
 29 October: 2023 Colombian regional elections

Health 
 2022 monkeypox outbreak in Colombia
 COVID-19 pandemic in Colombia

Deaths 
8 January – Luis Gabriel Ramírez Díaz, 57, Roman Catholic prelate, bishop of El Banco (2014–2021) and Ocaña (since 2021).

References 

 
Colombia
Colombia
2020s in Colombia
Years of the 21st century in Colombia